Glomeruloid hemangioma is a distinctive vascular tumor first described in 1990 when found to be associated with POEMS syndrome and Castleman disease.

See also 
 List of cutaneous conditions

References

Dermal and subcutaneous growths